The Big Interview with Dan Rather is an American television series on AXS TV, hosted by Dan Rather, in which he interviews major celebrities. In 2021 it entered into its 9th season, with close to 150 episodes total.

The show
Near the end of his own career after leaving CBS News in a cloud of controversy, Rather soon was signed by AXS TV. In 2013 his show kicked off with interviews of stars including Roger Daltrey and Linda Ronstadt. This foreshadowed a trend of Rather getting an increasing proportion of rock stars, even though he says of himself that he missed the Rock & Roll bandwagon until he was much older.

In the course of its eight seasons, Rather interviewed a list of noteworthies including:

Season 1
 Aaron Sorkin, Roger Daltrey & Cody Simpson, Merle Haggard, Linda Ronstadt & Daryl Hannah, Melissa Etheridge

Season 2
 Oliver Stone, Edward Norton, Crosby, Stills & Nash, Jane Lynch, Carol Burnett, Alan Alda, David Simon, Dolly Parton, Darius Rucker, Aaron Neville & Trombone Shorty, Charlie Daniels, Simon Cowell, Loretta Lynn, Jack White, Kenny Rogers, Gene Simmons, Annie Lennox

Season 3
 Wynonna Judd, Carlos Santana, Marty Stuart, Weird Al Yankovic, Daryl Hall, Don Rickles, Trisha Yearwood, Vince Gill, Lindsey Buckingham, Josh Groban, Florida Georgia Line, Frankie Valli, Paul Haggis, Emmylou Harris, John Leguizamo, Pat Benatar and Neil Giraldo, Rascal Flatts, Dwight Yoakam, Bob Weir, Heart, Patti LaBelle, Gregg Allman, Bryan Adams, Charley Pride, Quentin Tarantino, Kathy Ireland

Season 4
 John Fogerty. Benicio Del Toro, Willie Nelson, Tanya Tucker, Russell Simmons, Big & Rich, Sammy Hagar, Phil Collins, David Hasselhoff, Neil Young, Meat Loaf, Martina McBride, Gloria and Emilio Estefan, Mike Love, Carly Simon, Keith Urban

Season 5
 Kid Rock, Ice Cube, Kix Brooks, Crystal Gayle, Billy Gibbons, Norah Jones, Clint Black, Roger Waters, Sheryl Crow, Sharon Osbourne, The Doobie Brothers, Geddy Lee, Jewel, Kiefer Sutherland, Steve Miller, Peter Frampton, Michael Stipe & Mike Mills, Steve Van Zandt

Series overview

Episodes

Season 1 (2013–14)

Season 2 (2014)

Season 3 (2015)

Season 4 (2016)

Season 5 (2017)

Season 6 (2018)

Season 7 (2019)

Season 8 (2020-21)

Season 9 (2021)

References

External links
 

2010s American television talk shows